Skeletor is a supervillain and the main antagonist of the Masters of the Universe franchise created by Mattel, serving as the archenemy and uncle  of the protagonist He-Man. He is typically depicted as a blue-skinned humanoid who wears a purple hood over his bare-bone skull. Skeletor is determined to gain the powers of Castle Grayskull and rule the planet Eternia, and the entire universe; however, the incompetence of his henchmen is always an impediment to achieving his ambitions.

Appearances

Pre-Filmation minicomics ("savage Eternia")
The first minicomics that accompanied the 1981–1983 line of Masters of the Universe toys presented the earliest version of continuity and displayed many differences from the more widely known continuity of the later cartoon made by Filmation, and the later minicomics which complemented it. He-Man was depicted as the scarcely superhuman champion of a tribe of stone-age jungle-dwellers. There was no royal court of Eternia, King Randor, Queen Marlena, or Prince Adam yet.

These very first minicomics, which were actually more like storybooks, with a single image per page footed by prose, stated that Skeletor was originally an inhabitant of another dimension, populated with others of "his kind". During "The Great Wars", an ambiguous concept which is largely ignored in later continuities, a hole was opened in the dimensional wall and Skeletor was thrown from his world into Eternia. Significantly different from the lonelier and entirely self-serving Skeletor of later depictions, the villain's key motivation in this first story is to reopen the rift between his world and Eternia, thus allowing Skeletor's race to invade and conquer Eternia alongside him. This was the initially stated reason behind Skeletor's desire to obtain the powers of Castle Grayskull, not merely seeking power for its own sake as is generally the case in later depictions.

Filmation He-Man and the Masters of the Universe (1983)

In the 1980s cartoon series, Skeletor is a former pupil of Hordak, a high-ranking commander of the Evil Horde. When Hordak invaded Eternia and kidnapped one of the King and Queen's twin babies from the palace, Man-At-Arms and the Royal Guard captured his apprentice, Skeletor, and forced him to divulge the whereabouts of his master, who had retreated to his base of operations, Snake Mountain. When cornered, Hordak opened a random dimensional portal (later revealed to have led to Etheria) and leaped through with the baby Princess Adora in his possession. Skeletor remained on Eternia, raised an army of powerful minions of his own and took over as ruler of Snake Mountain. Skeletor's main goal is to conquer the mysterious fortress of Castle Grayskull, from which He-Man draws his powers. If he succeeds, Skeletor would be able to conquer not only Eternia, but the whole universe. At the same time, his other goal is to take revenge on Hordak and overthrow Horde Prime in his bid to conquer the universe.

Skeletor appeared in 71 of the 130 episodes of the 1980s He-Man cartoon (33 episodes in the first season, 38 in the second) and in 9 of the 93 episodes of the spin-off She-Ra: Princess of Power, for a total of 80 appearances, and also in The Secret of the Sword and A Christmas Special. He was voiced by Alan Oppenheimer in both series.  While he was occasionally seen as a bumbling figure whose plans were always foiled by He-Man and his friends, his intentions to conquer Eternia were taken seriously by He-Man, and sometimes by She-Ra. He-Man regarded Skeletor as his arch-foe, and Skeletor's plans were sometimes ruined through the fault of his minions rather than by his own incompetence.

Post-Filmation series minicomics
In the later minicomics by Mattel, it is hinted that Skeletor is in fact Keldor, King Randor's long-lost brother. This contradicts both earlier minicomics and cartoon series.

This implication occurs specifically in the 1986 minicomic entitled "The Search for Keldor", a story that involves Prince Adam and Randor searching for Randor's lost brother Keldor. When Skeletor learns of their quest, he muses that "they must never discover the secret of Keldor", as the truth will lead to his destruction.

In this story, King Randor announces that Keldor disappeared years ago. "He thought to master magic; when his experiments went wrong and he was lost in a dimension beyond time!" One of the few elements of Skeletor's back story that remains consistent throughout the various continuities is that he had come to Eternia from another dimension.

It is likely that Randor's statement about Keldor disappearing to another dimension is an attempt to reconcile Skeletor being He-Man's uncle with his Extra-Eternian origins. To find out what happened to Keldor, Randor and the Sorceress attempt to peer through a space-time rift that opens once every year.

Randor announces "I think I see Keldor... Or is it..." Before he can see anything else, Skeletor appears, determined to stop them from finding out any more. Although Skeletor is defeated, he is able to prevent Randor from discovering Keldor's fate as the rift once again closes for another year.

Skeletor's frantic effort to cover up what happened to Keldor, combined with the fact that Keldor vanished to another dimension when attempting to become a master sorcerer, is taken as a heavy implication that the two characters are indeed one and the same. Unfortunately, because the original MOTU toyline came to an end before the story could be resolved, it was never fully disclosed if this was officially intended to be the case.

Steven Grant, the writer-for-hire of the minicomic in question, stated in a he-man.org interview that "As far as I remember, Keldor was Skeletor... But, I don't think that was ever going to be revealed... I seem to remember it as one of those things Mattel came up with out of the blue... Slur Keldor and you end up with Skeletor... His back-story wasn't really worked out. Some sort of evil cosmic energies altered him. I think they were going for a Darth Vader thing, but it was a tack-on... The main idea was that if they found out Skeletor was Keldor, they'd be able to find out what had changed him and might find some way to reverse it."

In the new continuity of the 2002 animated series, Skeletor's original name was definitely Keldor; his appearance as such is shown and his exploits partially depicted. However, it seems unlikely that he is related to Randor in this continuity, as he has Skeletor's blue skin and some other slightly nonhuman features while he was still Keldor. In a he-man.org interview with one of producers of the 2002 series, it is revealed that Keldor is the half-brother of Randor; they have different mothers.

In the Masters of the Universe Classics toy line, further character development was introduced. This line has offered more in depth origins to the Masters of the Universe characters and a collaboration of all origins in attempt to create a new coherent continuity. According to their revised back story, Keldor is Randor's half-brother. Keldor's mother was a member of the Gar race and he was ousted from the royal castle due to his Gar heritage. He roamed Eternia for knowledge, eventually learning the Dark Arts from Hordak. He then sought to unite Eternia by ruling it himself and battle his own half-brother with his army of fellow misfits. After losing the battle and desperate to survive, he turned to his mentor Hordak who merged Keldor with an entity known as the Demo-Man. Together they formed Skeletor. Keldor also appears in the DC comics but was cursed by his father and became Skeletor.

Masters of the Universe (1987 film)

Frank Langella portrayed Skeletor in the 1987 live-action film. As this was a PG motion picture, this depiction of the character was far darker and more menacing than his comical animated counterpart, serving as both a competent and threatening antagonist to the heroes. During the course of the movie, Skeletor captures Castle Grayskull and imprisons the Sorceress after Evil-Lyn tricks an Earth girl named Julie into giving her the Cosmic Key. He later absorbs the power of the Great Eye and transforms into a golden demonic god, but is ultimately thrown off a cliff into a vat of unknown substance by He-Man. In a post-credits scene, Skeletor emerges from the vat proclaiming, "I'll be back." This depiction of Skeletor is clad in more regal attire than traditional incarnations, wearing a black cloak and robe that covers his entire body. To prepare for the role, Langella asked his kids questions about Skeletor and watched the original series. His performance is highly regarded by fans and critics as being a high point in the film, and Langella himself has regarded Skeletor as one of his favorite roles in his entire career.

The New Adventures of He-Man (1990)

The New Adventures series sees Skeletor (voiced by Campbell Lane) with a new outfit, chest armour, cybernetic implants and a mauve cape. Skeletor fools the Galactic Guardians, Hydron and Flipshot, into thinking he is the force of good they need to save their home planet, Primus, when in fact they came looking for He-Man. Unable to decide who is good and who is evil, Skeletor and He-Man are both transported to the futuristic planet Primus, where Skeletor reveals his true evil nature to the Primans as the Mutants attack. Skeletor and the Mutant leader, Flogg, come to an agreement: Skeletor will help Flogg conquer Primus in return for Flogg's help in destroying He-Man. One of Flogg's terms is that he will remain in charge of the Mutants. Skeletor agrees, and is able to manipulate and control Flogg from behind the scenes, while making himself a force to be reckoned with among Primans and Mutants alike.

In the episode "Sword and Staff", Skeletor finds a powerful crystal on Moon Nordor and absorbs its power, making him more powerful and evil than ever before, and changing his appearance drastically, including a yellow face with red eyes, and different armour and helmet, based on the "Disks of Doom Skeletor" toy. Throughout the series, Skeletor concocts various schemes to destroy He-Man and conquer Primus.

Although The New Adventures series follows the continuity of the Filmation cartoon, Skeletor is quite a different character. He possesses a sarcastic sense of humor and often jokes and laughs, taking his own failures much better than in the previous series. He has a genuine relationship with Crita, a female mutant with purple skin. He even dances with her in one episode. He also works well with Flogg, Slush Head and the other Mutants as part of their team as well as having a pet named Gur. Though often displaying a more relaxed attitude, when enraged, he simply becomes a maniac and lashes out in anger at anyone around him. He is able to instill fear into Flogg despite being perfectly willing to take his orders when it suits his own purposes. Overall, the Skeletor in this series is portrayed as a far more competent and threatening character despite his often comedic lines.

The first toys for the "New Adventures" line, which was marketed simply as "He-Man", gave a different explanation for how He-Man and Skeletor ended up in the future via a mini-comic packed in with various figures, as well as actually providing a reason for the cybernetics Skeletor employed in the first few episodes of the "New Adventures" TV series. In this mini-comic, Skeletor also learned that He-Man and Prince Adam were the same being, only for Adam to become He-Man permanently. The energy output caused by this final change from prince to warrior was partly the reason for Skeletor's new cybernetic look when the character was forced to take drastic measures to treat wounds that would have otherwise been fatal without treatment.

He-Man and the Masters of the Universe (2002)

Skeletor appears in the 2002 TV series voiced by Brian Dobson, serving as the main antagonist of the first season and one of the three secondary antagonists (alongside Kobra Khan and Rattlor) of the second season. In this new version, it is shown that Skeletor was formerly a warlord named Keldor who had trained in the dark arts. Keldor was taught the ways of black magic by summoning Hordak, who was trapped in the dark dimension, Despondos. He gathered a small band of warriors to attack the Hall of Wisdom. They encountered resistance from Captain Randor and his officers; Keldor fought Randor personally, wielding two swords with astounding proficiency, but when Randor disarmed him, Keldor threw a vial of acid at him, but Randor deflected it with his shield, and the acid splashed back onto Keldor's face.

As Kronis (who later became Trap Jaw) called for a retreat, Evil-Lyn took Keldor to Hordak's sanctuary, where Keldor summoned Hordak to save his life. Keldor agreed to pay whatever price Hordak wished for his own life, and Hordak transformed him, stripping the damaged tissues from his skull and dubbing him Skeletor; Keldor's head had been completely stripped of soft tissues, leaving only a floating skull. When Keldor saw his new appearance, he laughed maniacally about it; the incident possibly shattering whatever sanity he had left. Hordak can also apparently speak to Skeletor from Despondos through telepathy which also causes Skeletor great pain.

Trapped in the Dark Hemisphere by the Mystic Wall, Skeletor designed a machine that would destroy it, but it needed the Corodite Crystal as a power source. When Mer-Man retrieved it, Skeletor destroyed the Mystic Wall and returned to menacing Eternia.

Unlike his previous portrayals, Skeletor is not concerned with Castle Grayskull at first, until a giant fish-monster that had swallowed the remnants of the Corodite Crystal - thus making him hunger for power, heads toward Grayskull. The Eternian warriors, led by Man-At-Arms and He-Man, stop the monster, forcing Skeletor to ponder what could be in that ancient pile of stones worth dying for. At the time, the Heroic Warriors seem ready and willing to let Grayskull fall, and would likely have done so, if not for the urgings of Man-At-Arms, who had been swallowed whole by the monster. In the first season finale, Skeletor directly attacks it with his Council of Evil: himself, Count Marzo, Evilseed, the three evil Giants and Webstor. When King Hiss and the Snake Men are freed from the Void, Hiss imprisons Skeletor, having him devoured by a giant snake, but Skeletor escapes after the Masters defeat Hiss.

Despite owing his life to Hordak, Skeletor destroys Hordak's sanctuary to prevent him from returning. Skeletor did not want to hold up his end of the bargain and free Hordak from Despondos because he wanted Eternia for himself. At the end of the second season, King Hiss revives Serpos, the Serpent God, who had been transformed into Snake Mountain by the Elders; Skeletor and his minions were inside the mountain at that time, though Serpos is defeated and restored to its Snake Mountain form. If a third season of the series had been produced, it would have seen Skeletor and He-Man dealing with the Horde invasion and the powerful Hordak, who it was said Skeletor would eventually have defeated. This season would have also shown Skeletor's part in the kidnapping of He-Man's twin sister, She-Ra, and sending her to Hordak to be raised. 

In the series, Skeletor is again portrayed as a bully towards his minions but with an even more malicious edge, using his powerful abilities to threaten his followers or to silence them. He also constantly blames his followers for their defeats at the hands of the Masters, and rules through a policy of fear, which makes him somewhat different compared to King Hiss. Many episodes end with him either punishing or torturing his minions for their failures. Also like previous versions, he is shown to possess almost no loyalty towards his followers as demonstrated in the last episodes of the first season, where he sends his own Evil Warriors into a trap to get captured just to lull the Masters into a false sense of security. He even goes as far as replacing them with his 'Council of Evil'. He is further shown to be power-mad and unwilling to share the spoils of war; as demonstrated when he tells Count Marzo when questioned if they will gain anything from Castle Grayskull, that he will give them a reward if he feels like doing so.

In the beginning of the first season, he demonstrates a deep-rooted hatred towards King Randor for his part in destroying his face and making him what he is now; though he also attributes that to Evil-Lyn for saving him. This gradually shifts towards hatred against He-Man for standing in his way constantly. Furthermore, his maniacal laughter can perhaps indicate that he might have become insane by the loss of his face, something that is mentioned in the Icons of Evil comics when Trap Jaw, mentions that Skeletor is no longer the leader he once followed. Finally, despite his evil, Skeletor has been known to grovel when his life is in jeopardy, though this is usually an attempt to get the upper hand before betraying his savior, which is seen on a few occasions to trick He-Man into dropping his guard before attacking and escaping.

As with all the Mike Young Productions series' characters, Skeletor's appearance is based on his figure from the Four Horsemen-designed toyline which the cartoon was produced to promote. Skeletor is the character that received perhaps the least-extensive redesign from his original toy/cartoon version. However, when this new design was then translated into animated form, MYP's artists usually gave him a voluminous cape; something which neither the new toy, nor the original incarnation of the character ever wore. The cape is typically adorned in situations where Skeletor chose to employ powerful magical feats. Skeletor is still commonly seen without his cape in the 2002 series while at rest or in combat situations not requiring extensive use of magic. When a later convention-exclusive figure of Keldor was made using the existing Skeletor body, a removable cloth cape was included. As the figure came with three swappable heads including his Keldor face; his burning, acid-splashed visage; and his final Skeletor head, this figure could thus be configured into a "show-accurate" caped Skeletor.

Another note is that his eyes appear, glowing red, in his sockets whenever he becomes enraged or demonstrates his magic powers. When Hiss was going to turn him to stone, he proclaims his eyes are closed but Evil-Lyn proclaims he has no eyes.

The 2002 version of Skeletor is generally regarded as competent, although unlike the New Adventures version, was unable to accomplish any real victory.

He-Man and the Masters of the Universe (2012)

In the comics published by DC Comics, Skeletor works to prevent Adam from remembering who he really is at all costs.

Skeletor is disappointed that Beast Man failed yet discovered that Adam is not without skill. Their attempt to wipe his memory completely failed to erase his instinctive understanding of battle. Skeletor shows Beast Man mercy, but warns that his troublesome nephew must die if he doesn't stay within these boundaries. When Skeletor sends words to his allies that Adam must be prevented from learning who he really is, the first to take action is Trap Jaw and his riders who ambush Adam in the desert.

Skeletor mused at how he had previously worked so hard to capture Adam's sword thinking that it was the source of He-Man's power. Skeletor now knows that the sword is merely a conduit to the powers of Castle Grayskull. His dinner guest is a catatonic Sorceress of Castle Grayskull as he tries to get her to give him the knowledge of accessing the powers of Castle Grayskull. When Adam and Teela are on a ship at sea, Skeletor sends word to Mer-Man to dispose of "Prince" Adam.

Skeletor is getting annoyed at the fact that none of his allies have successfully killed Adam. He can't leave Castle Grayskull to do the job himself or else he won't get back in. Even with all the torture he has caused the Sorceress of the castle, he worries that she is the key to unlocking the castle's power.

Evil-Lyn reports the misplacement of her prisoners Adam and Teela to Skeletor. When she points out that the bird Zoar caused Adam to fall and discover the means of escape, Skeletor realizes that the Sorceress of Grayskull has been undermining him. Angrily, he bursts into her cell and demands to know where in his mind she was hiding. She reveals that she hid in plain sight within a pleasant memory....moments he rarely revisits. Grabbing her by the neck, he explains that he does not need her to get at Grayskull's power and snaps it dropping her limp body to the floor.

At Castle Grayskull, Skeletor has been informed by Beast Man that He-Man will be coming for him now that he has regained his memories, and wants to prepare Castle Grayskull for a siege. Skeletor tells Beast Man to do so if it brings him comfort. He then engages in a conversation with a head that has been advising him throughout the series, and eventually throws it through the window in a fit of rage. At Castle Grayskull, the preparations for the expected attack are complete. Skeletor, Beast Man. and Evil-Lyn overlook the battlefield in front of the castle, and await He-Man's arrival. Skeletor magically removes Evil-Lyn's mouth when she continues to speak even after he has ordered her to be silent.

He-Man tells Teela that he believes Skeletor is dead, then is seen calling himself a liar under his breath. Skeletor is revealed to have survived the fall into the chasm, but his skull is now cracked and broken, with his lower jaw appearing to be absent. Skeletor finds himself faced with the head that he threw out of the castle earlier, and it is revealed that this is some sort of minion that encourages Skeletor to not accept defeat. The final frames reveal that an unknown enemy that wishes Skeletor dead, but is not yet prepared to see it happen, has been manipulating Skeletor throughout the entire saga.

Masters of the Universe: Revelation
Skeletor eventually discovered that Castle Grayskull was just a shell, and that its sole purpose was to guard the Orb of Power. The Lord of Destruction used the Shaping Staff to disguise himself as one of his henchmen, Spikor and together with Evil-Lyn, disguised as Clawful, pretended to have been captured by He-Man (in reality the robot Faker). This deception managed to dupe the Sorceress long enough for the Evil Warriors to enter Grayskull, after which Skeletor ordered the rest of his forces to launch a full-scale attack on the castle, in order to engage the Heroic Warriors and Royal Guards who were bound to come to Grayskull's defense.

Quickly gaining access to the very heart of Grayskull, Skeletor defeated the powerful Nature God Moss Man and maneuvered He-Man into stabbing him with his mighty sword in such a way that the sword would penetrate the Orb of Power as well and open it as if it were a key. Skeletor struck the orb with his own Havoc Staff afterwards, cracking it and releasing the magic power that created Eternia and the very universe.

The Sorceress knew that this meant the end of all existence, but was able to freeze time for a short period so that she could confer with He-Man and Teela. He-Man attempted to absorb the magical energy of the Orb with his Sword of Power, which split in two. When this happened, his noble steed Battle Cat transformed back into Cringer and He-Man reverted back to Prince Adam. Skeletor attempted to grab the two halves of the sword for himself, and both he and Adam were obliterated in the explosion caused by the magical impact. The only thing which remained was the top of Skeletor's Havoc Staff.

Only a tiny sliver of Skeletor's essence survived the explosion, and took refugee in Evil-Lyn's wand staff without her knowledge. Teela went on a quest to recover the two halves of the Sword of Power and reforge them into one. Evil-Lyn, carrying her wand, and her protector Beast Man were among the warriors who joined Teela. In the Eternian afterlife, Preternia, they were reunited with Adam, who gave up his everlasting reward to return to the land of the living so he could call upon the power of Grayskull and restore magic to the entire universe. When magic returned, Skeletor was finally able to reform himself, and stabbed Adam in the back before he could transform into He-Man. Skeletor took the Sword of Power afterwards, asked Evil-Lyn and Beast Man to join him at his side, and took the power of Grayskull for himself, becoming Skelegod.

He-Man & the Masters of the Universe (2021)
Skeletor appears in the 2021 CGI He-Man reboot, voiced by Ben Diskin. Unlike his previous incarnations, he is a full-blooded human (rather than a Gar-human hybrid) and the younger brother of King Randor (as opposed to being his older half-brother). This is the first time Skeletor's familial relationship with He-Man has been portrayed in any televised media. 

Ten years before the events of the series, Keldor kidnapped a young Adam while his allies Kronis and Evelyn launched a coup against the kingdom. He forcibly took his nephew to Castle Grayskull where he demanded that Eldress hand over the power of the castle to him in exchange for the young prince. Eldress then spawned two relics, the Sword of Power and the Havoc Staff, letting Keldor make his choice. Deeming the sword to be nothing but a soldier's tool, he took the Staff and plunged it into the castle's beam of light in an attempt to gain its power. Keldor's selfish act had the effect of cursing him and turning his left hand into a skeleton. Enraged, Keldor briefly attempted to attack Eldress only so that Adam interferes with the sword. Subsequently, Keldor fled to Snake Mountain, continuing to suffer from the curse he himself caused.

In "The Sword of Grayskull", when a now-adolescent Adam, living in the jungle with the Tiger Tribe and having forgotten his previous life, succeeds in transforming into He-Man, a stil-reculusive Keldor at Snake Mountain feels the power of Grayskull that he has always coveted.

In "The Power of Grayskull", Keldor travels to a royal outpost where he sucks life energy from the royal soldiers, turning them to stone. He then reunites with Kronis and Evelyn whom he had not seen since the coup and allies himself again upon learning that they know where the sword is. He later "saves" Adam and his friends from a robot attack before revealing to his nephew that he is his uncle.

In "The Heirs of Grayskull", while Teela and Duncan remain suspicious of him, Keldor slowly gains Adam's trust by revealing his royal bloodline to him. When he learns that Adam was previously transformed, Keldor takes the sword out of his hand and Kronis fires a missile at the rock, entombing Adam, Teela, and Krass. With the sword in his possession, Keldor and his two allies take the direction of the castle on an overbike. Evelyn offers Keldor to walk past but the fallen prince admits he doesn't trust them, to which Kronis replies that they don't trust him either. Once there, Keldor pushes the sword into a magical base to unlock the entrance to the castle. When Adam, too, arrives with his friends and sees the holographic projection revealing the events ten years ago, a magically empowered Keldor confronts him while Kronis and Evelyn capture the others.

In "The Champions of Grayskull", Keldor orders Adam to use Grayskull's power to heal him where his friends will suffer. He takes pleasure in taunting each of his hostages with mocking nicknames when he learns of Adam's pseudonym as He-Man. He-Man eventually relents but wins enough time for Teela and the others to free herself from the imprisonment spell. Then ensues a fight between the antagonists and the protagonists also receiving part of the power of Grayskull. Keldor and He-Man clash violently in the depths of the castle. As he gains the upper hand, Keldor calls He-Man as arrogant as his father before being knocked back by an energy-boosting punch. Refusing defeat, Keldor once again attempts to gain Grayskull's power through the light beam, only to seemingly be consumed along with his henchmen.

Unbeknownst to the heroes, the evil trio survived and returned to Snake Mountain, although Keldor was further disfigured by his curse. Evelyn offers to help him reverse the curse, but he refuses, not seeing what just happened to him as a curse but as the realization that he had long been wrong, that the power of a now amplified Havoc Staff was the real power he sought and that his true destiny is to bring fear and devastation to Eternia. He finally declares that the era of Grayskull is over and that now comes the era of Skeletor.

In "We Have the Power", soon after his transformation, Skeletor spent time soaking in a pit of molten Havoc, learning from his mistakes. Evelyn suggests that he share his power like He-Man did with his friends to prevail over them last time. Although tempted, Skeletor claims that sharing magic is only possible with the same metal that the Sword of Power is forged, Kurbinite, like the Havoc Staff which is made of more ordinary materials. Kronis reveals that he knows where Randor is storing Kurbinite but that its access is not within their reach since security has been tightened and Teela has changed sides. Skeletor then thinks of finding a new thief close to the king before reviving ancient creatures for his plan. Following the monsters attacking a royal convoy, one of the undead creatures returns General Dolos to Skeletor, allowing Kronis to holographically reproduce Dolos' physical appearance on himself, allowing them to take the Kurbinite with ease.

In "The Calm Before the Storm", Skeletor recruits the hunter capable of controlling the animals R'Qazz, quickly acquiring a liking to the feline man whom he finds more beast-like than a man as well as his third person. He then explains to his three minions his plan to take control of Eternos before taking R'Qazz's whip, Evelyn's specter and Kronis' jawbone prosthesis and using his dark magic combined with Kurbinite to magically modify them, while babbling an evil monologue intended for his brother. During his experiment, he launches a magical storm against Eternos. Later as he continues to hammer at objects, Skeletor then switches to using the Havoc Staff to complete his work. With the trio now equipped with more powerful weapons, Evelyn remarks that the gang spotted their position, exactly as Skeletor had planned.

In "Cry Havoc Part 1", Adam, Duncan, Cringer and Teela arrive at the entrance to Snake Mountain where Skeletor enjoys taunting them from a distance with a loudspeaker. Once the group arrives at the center of the fortress, Skeletor faces them for the first time since his attack on Grayskull, revealing his new appearance as well as his new name. He-Man doesn't understand the meaning of his new name, forcing an unbelievable Skeletor to make it clear that this is due to his skull shape, prompting Battle Cat to suggest choosing "Skull-etor" instead. When the comedic moment passed, Kronis, Evelyn, and R'Qazz showed up on their own, not impressing the quartet until Skeletor activated their overpowered transformations, transforming them into Trap Jaw, Evil-Lyn and Beast Man respectively.

With each taking on their rival in a Pocket Dimension, Skeletor and He-Man engage in a fierce fight in which He-Man admits to his uncle that he felt sorry for thinking he was dead. Unresponsive, Skeletor wonders if Randor will feel the same weakness when He-Man is be dead. At the end of this epic clash, Skeletor reveals that he believed for a long time that Grayskull's power was his only way to obtain the throne of Eternos but that he ended up turning to darkness when he realized that Grayskull's power was nothing but a lie. Successfully chaining the sword with chains made to its full power without He-Man being able to get rid of it, Skeletor breaks it with all his might in two, causing the Masters of the Universe to regress to their base form. His defeated enemies, Skeletor and his Dark Masters launch their army consisting of the reprogrammed robot, the mind-controlled Royal Guard, and the ever-controlled Dolos against Eternos, leaving Adam and his friends to be engulfed in the pit to either be corrupted to evil or drown, both cases befitting the dastardly Skeletor.

In "Cry Havoc Part 2", Skeletor brags about his success, only to be suddenly betrayed by his three minions who had been plotting to overthrow him for a while. Unfortunately for them, Skeletor is able to overpower them and strip them of their power, having intuitively anticipate their rebellion against him. He reveals to them that he did not need Kurbinite to share his powers with them but to control them and that he is the only one who can share or take back his power. Reducing his three minions to his will, Skeletor transforms them back into Dark Masters and launches the attack on the kingdom.

Once inside the palace, Skeletor confronts his brother after ten years, showing himself at first annoyed that Randor is not shocked by his morbid appearance and even daring to make a joke as he remembers. When the entire Masters of the Universe and having had the sword repaired join the fight, a Skeletor annoyed by their survival is happy that Randor can attend the next fight. The Villains gain the upper hand at first, only to be repelled by the very first combined attack of the five Heroes. Not admitting defeat, Skeletor surrounds the group with the entire army of Randor who fell under his control during the fight. He-Man swears they'll keep fighting until they've freed them all, which Skeletor knows full well and which is the same reason he besieged Grayskull Castle to destroy the source of their powers. Although the Masters of the Universe manage to escape and move Grayskull to another dimension, Skeletor ultimately earns what he has always coveted and sits on the throne of Eternos.

In "The World Above", Keldor is first seen in flashback, explaining to a young Adam that the other kingdoms are on bad terms with Eternos because they coveted the Sigil of King Hiss for the sole purpose of bringing back their deceased. In the present, Skeletor, remembering that time, regrets not having used this knowledge earlier to become a god, pushing him to now covet the Sigil.

He later parades around the city demanding that the townspeople show their joy, which Evil-Lyn remarks is not won but Skeletor intends to change that once he has the Sigil. When Trap-Jaw is about to eat, Skeletor magically paralyzes him to order him to go work on the new weapons of war he had asked for. Spy Drones records his exchange with Evil-Lyn's plan to seek the Sigil through, but Skeletor notices them and orders Beast Man to hunt them down.

As the Masters of the Universe transform in Avion, Skeletor is able to sense it, but Evil-Lyn instead believes it could be the accidental activation of artifacts from Castle Grayskull in the Savage Lands. Beast Man then contacts his master to tell him that he has found Teela and Randor.

In "The World Below", Skeletor discovers a secret clue on the King Grayskull's board revealing the Sigil to be at Snake Mountain. On his way there, he sees his enemies' vehicle, causing him to realize that they are alive and that Grayskull Castle was not destroyed, leaving him to suspect that Evil-Lyn may have lied to him though she says she's just as surprised. The Masters of the Universe's new ally, Stratos, rushes straight at them just for Skeletor to expose him with a single shot, worrying an Evil-Lyn fearing retaliation from Avion that Skeletor has nothing to do with. A surprise attack by Krass and He-Man ensues which leaves Skeletor alone to face them while Evil-Lyn infiltrates the old lair.

Fighting against Krass, Skeletor notices her looking to break his scepter before easily foiling her charging attack. He then notices the jewels on the girl's helmet which he seems intrigued for a while. He-Man throws his sword at Krass who clings to it and launches another attack, distracting Skeletor long enough for He-Man to hit him so hard he waltzes through the air. He recovers quickly and takes Stratos hostage then demands the piece of the Sigil they have just found in exchange for his life. He-Man refuses to bargain so Skeletor decides to finish them all off on his own but Evil-Lyn begs him not to bring Avion into their dispute, just for Skeletor to order her to stop contradicting him. Evil-Lyn has no choice but to teleport them both off the mountain.

Returning to Eternos, Skeletor unleashes his wrath on Evil-Lyn and destroys her scepter, transforming her back into Evelyn. Finally tired of her insubordination, the evil lord furiously dismisses Evelyn. Beast Man then returns to inform Skeletor that Randor to find allies in the sewers passes and knowing that his brother has already broken camp, Skeletor decides to send the Tri-Klops.

In "Eternia 2000", Skeletor brings Trap-Jaw and Beast Man to the castle vault where the second piece of the Sigil is supposed to be but angrily discovers that the entire vault has been stolen. quickly to confront his nephew on the high-speed craft. The two end up inside, confronted by robots self-destructing at the sight of the violence, forcing them to go on a temporary truce so they can find a piece of the Sigil without blowing it all up. The object sealed in a room filled with dancing kamikaze robots, the uncle and nephew start dancing comically just to get closer to the piece. Skeletor about to grab the piece, Stratos makes a crashing entrance which causes the robots to clash as well as the destruction of the train. Escaping by way of his vehicle, Skeletor yells at He-Man that there is only one piece left to find to complete the Sigil.

In "Meanwhile...", it's Skeletor's birthday but none of the hundreds of gifts he receives makes him happy because he desperately wants Battle Cat. Trap-Jaw does, however, give him something he really enjoys, a super-powered panther-patterned jet-bike named Painthor. Beast Man in turn offers a stone from Evelyn's supposedly granted treasure collection a wish. A convinced Skeletor doesn't know what to wish for when he suddenly disappears in front of his two minions.

Skeletor finds himself in Grayskull, face to face with Duncan. The two come to blows and Skeletor easily overpowers the young man transformed into Man-At-Arms then defeats him with a kick, sending him crashing into the statue of Eldress. Crossing the magic veil to see where his enemies have been hiding all this time, Skeletor discovers that it's impossible to get out of the castle, so he forces Duncan to unlock this apparent magic lock.

While walking underground, Skeletor sees and tries to grab the piece of the Sigil despite Duncan's attempts to stop him but is electrocuted when he touches it, all due to Duncan's failed attempts to bring Eldress back who has also stuck in cosmic limbo. Duncan also accidentally reveals that Grayskull is in Avion. The two then search for answers on the wishing stone in the library and only learn that there is only one wish per person and only from the heart, prompting Skeletor to throw the stone out of the castle so as not to Duncan use it against him before ordering him back to work.

Later, Skeletor nearly unmasks Duncan using a robot to retrieve the stone, but the kid falsely claims it's just his assistant. Skeletor doesn't understand at the moment why Duncan doesn't just use his power, only to retort that he doesn't need to always use his power before asking Skeletor why he never becomes Keldor again. Skeletor replies that Keldor is ancient history, while saying it was his birthday today, something Duncan doesn't know the meaning of since he grew up in an orphanage. Skeletor then gets angry when Duncan implies that today might also be his birthday, wanting to keep the day for himself.

After going to the bathroom, Skeletor notices the painting depicting the clash between the Masters of the Universe and the Dark Masters and criticizes the depiction of his head before finding it strange that Krass is not his own nemesis. Duncan suddenly surprises him with a birthday present, just for Skeletor to blow up the pastry while being disappointed by the turn his party has taken. Duncan then decides to give the Bag of Bones an unforgettable birthday, at first a dud that only makes Skeletor happy when he puts his personal, crude and selfish grain of salt into it.

Duncan briefly retrieves the Wishing Stone, only for Skeletor to find out and take it back by force, leading to some sort of unlikely chase through the castle that only ends with Skeletor about to blast the stone. Duncan however manages to convince him that he actually wants to use it to bring them back to their reality instead of using it for his personal desire, although Skeletor only gives it back to him because he'd rather risk disappearing than to be stuck here with a kid with values and morals.

With the wish granted, Skeletor appears on the throne of Eternos as Randor had nearly turned the mind-controlled guards against Trap-Jaw and Beast Man who were vying for Eternos' rule. Taken to imprisonment, Randor tells his brother that he will never complete the Sigil but Skeletor disagrees, telling Trap-Jaw to prepare the Painthor for Airplane and that the piece of the Sigil will be easy to steal. now that Eldress is no longer in Grayskull. He then wishes himself a happy birthday.

In "Divided We Stand", Skeletor and his army arrive in Avion, ready to begin battle.

In "The Battle of Avion", Skeletor and He-Man begins to fight fiercely on the Painthor, with He-Man warning his uncle about whether he had hurt his father, which the dastardly Skeletor sadistically replies that he did well to hurt Randor. Skeletor kicks He-Man out with an energy blast but He-Man is caught by Gringer. Teela then intervenes, accidentally dragging the four individuals back onto the Grayskull. With the Red Legion temporarily incapacitated, Skeletor continues his attempt to obtain the pieces of Sigil regardless, only for He-Man to cause them to touch each other, throwing the jet-bike off and slightly injuring his uncle. The Masters of the Universe receive the support of King Stratos and his allies, but the situation is quickly desperate when the Red Legion attacks the flying city on Skeletor's orders while the latter continues to fight against his enemies.

When the combined assaults of Cringer, Teela, and Duncan finally land a heavy blow, Skeletor unleashes a final attack that knocks He-Man into the void while Trap Jaw and Beast-Man defeat the three remaining Masters. On the verge of being able to seize the pieces, Skeletor has the unpleasant surprise to see He-Man return to the Wind Raider with Krass and to suffer the laser fire from the ship which separates Skeletor from his Havoc Staff. Trap Jaw and Beast Man break free from his magical control and once again turn on a weakened Skeletor, feigning help to better restrain him. As He-Man charges the Sword of Power with his friends' power, Skeletor breaks free and nearly retrieves his staff but Krass slams into him before he can grab it. Once the top of the staff is split open by a He-Man, a siphon of Havoc magic occurs and as Skeletor is restrained from being absorbed by Kronis and R'Qazz depowered, his two former minions end up deliberately drop him in. More and more aspired to his loss, Skeletor creates a magical chain to cling to Krass's helmet who also tries to escape the siphon but his powers eventually wear off, dooming Skeletor to be absorbed by the scepter and seemingly wiped out when the Havoc Staff regresses to its original appearance, leaving only the still smoking and cracked skull of the tyrant that Krass kicks out of Avion.

Later, it turns out that Skeletor managed to place his spirit in the stone embedded in Krass's helmet then reveals himself to her by revealing that the jewel is called a Ram Stone and he can't wait to tell her more.

In "The Fifth Nemesis", as Krass is the only one who can see and hear Skeletor, the young girl attempts to dismiss him as her imagination until Skeletor confirms that he can see into Krass' blind spot. As the Ram Stone is actually a proto-Havoc, Skeletor tries to convince her of her true nature, while telling her that she could bring her parents back with the Sigil. As the day passes and Krass feels more and more pushed aside by her friends who fully appreciate life in Eternos unlike her while Adam seems to put aside his life in the Tiger Tribe, Skeletor takes the opportunity to try more and more to convince Krass to side with him. Krass then threatens to get rid of her helmet, so he won't harass her again, just to have Skeletor remind her that this is all she has left of her biological family, so Krass openly states that the Masters of the Universe are her family now. Sarcastically, Skeletor then encourages Krass to reveal to Adam that he's into her mind and that she's had evil Havoc inside her heart all along.

Skeletor once again shows up when Krass secretly overhears Adam say to Randor she would be a terrible representative of the Tiger Tribe, discussing how Randor turning on him isn't all that different from her brotherly figure seeming to betray her in every way while asking him which of Skeletor and Adam is really hurting her right now. A heartbroken Krass ends up stealing the peace of Sigil from the palace and goes to Grayskull to activate the three relics as Skeletor had hoped. He-Man attempts to reason with his childhood friend but Krass ends up rejecting him then summons the Havoc Staff and transforms into Rampage by combining the power of Grayskull with the Havoc within her. A fight ensues between the two former best friends, during which He-Man tries to warn Krass that she can't trust Skeletor, only to have her bring him down after insinuating that Skeletor is the only one to really help her. By fusing the three pieces of the Sigil, Krass unleashes the magic of the late King Hiss, awakening the Serpents Undead everywhere while Skeletor looks forward to this new friendship with the now Rampage the Dark Master of Destruction.

In "The Haunting of Castle Grayskull", now connected to the castle, Skeletor is able to access past holograms showing him King Grayskull using a Krass-like stone to create dark magic of Havoc which is itself the source of Skeletor's power in the goal to defeat King Hiss and his army of snake men. Rampage quickly backtracks on his promise to use the Sigil to bring her parents back but Skeletor clarifies that he promised to help the girl bring her parents back but not with the help of the Sigil as the item doesn't have that. power, the resurrection of the Snake-Men also being only a means of keeping the Masters Of Universe at bay while having henchmen for the accomplishment of the final project. He-Man then arises and unsuccessfully attempts to attack the incorporeal ghost who then uses his control of Castle Grayskull to shoot from the beam of light at his nephew and throw him out of the castle. Considering the rules of the game have changed and He-Man has already lost this game, Skeletor uses the Sigil to send Snake-Men to attack.

Two weeks later, Skeletor oversees the Snake-Men's search of the hidden tomb of one of the most powerful beings in all of Eternia, King Grayskull. Krass doesn't understand the point until his new master explains that the castle's true power comes from whoever created it and that once he takes possession of his body shell, he will come alive again, will bring Krass' parents back to life and put an end to all strife. Fearing Skeletor's future power and not fully trusting him, Rampage wants him to promise that he will keep his word where she will destroy his helmet stone to end the ghost's existence. Undaunted, Skeletor laughs and claims he much prefers Rampage to the broken-armed, good-for-nothings who were once his minions.

In "Frozen Solid", as Krass begins to question herself, Skeletor appears behind her announcing that there is a problem, infuriating the girl. Skeletor pretends at the moment that they are not so different from each other since they were despised and rejected by their families, even that they are the same but that only irritates d advantage Krass until Skeletor advises him not to choose the wrong enemy. Getting back to the problem, the Snake-Men don't have the goal of the hit yet Skeletor thinks Rampage might be the answer.

Later, Rampage confronts He-Man, Cringer and Randor confronting the Snake-Men and Skeletor forbids him to waste any more time digging or else they will make Randor pay, causing Rampage to overstep Skeletor's authority, judging that is going too far. He-Man warns the Skeletor that he can't see not to drag his father into their conflict. Skeletor mocks Adam's love for his father and asks Krass what her father would have thought of her if he saw him hesitate like that. Rampage then proceeds to tell his former allies about the plan against Skeletor's advice in an effort to gain beneficial collaboration. Not wanting his son to suffer by losing someone else he loves as he did with Keldor, Randor reveals that Grayskull's burial is in the only place where there are no serpents, the sea realm of Leviathae and guarded by Monstroids. Having got what she wanted, Rampage knocks He-Man down and then leaves, taking out the army of snakes on the spot.

In "Wrath of the Mer-Man", Rampage travels to Leviathe on the Painthor but Skeletor grows impatient to arrive despite knowing the way. The ghost then proceeds to stalk the young girl to pass the time, even striking silly poses to fly through the air, so Krass suggests that she instead disappear until they arrive. The Dark Masters, having regained their power, suddenly attack Rampage from their magic bat ship, knocking her into the void and leading Skeletor to comment that if he never has a new ship it's because they are still destroyed then suggests Rampage get into an energy ball to survive the fall though not sure if it will work but He-Man ends up saving his former best friend and the two soon make a truce against the Monstroid and the Dark Masters, much to Skeletor's amusement.

Once the scrap piles are destroyed, Mer-Man rises from the depths and subjugates the warriors with his telepathic powers, wanting to know who came with the intention of bringing King Grayskull back to life. Mer-Man being able to see Skeletor, the ghost introduces himself to the Abyssal King and warns him that he'll let him pass if he doesn't want to get in more trouble. Seeing the Sigil, a cheerful Mer-Man claims to have waited too long and peacefully opens the door to his underwater kingdom for Skeletor and Rampage.

In "The Tomb of Grayskull", thanks to the castle-like magical property of the tomb, Skeletor physically manifests in front of a He-Man having found Grayskull's body. He then provokes his nephew to try to stop him definitively before he seizes the bones of the deceased king and comes back to life by confronting to death the one who was like a sister for him. Adam states that Krass is not his enemy, just a puppet of Skeletor who is his real enemy. Skeletor claims she trusts him but He-Man doesn't believe it so his uncle says he might not know her as well as he thought before a pissed off Rampage at being called a puppet furiously attacks her former brother while Skeletor tries to find a way to live again.

He brings the bones back to the castle through the connection between the two locations but wants Rampage to kill He-Man before they leave. Again Krass challenges his orders, causing Skeletor to summon hundreds of Snake-Men with the Sigil and then orders the girl to initiate Plan B while using his desire to see his parents again to force her to obey. She throws the Sigil to the ground then the snakes merge into a giant cobra while Krass and Skeletor return to the castle.

In "A Leap of Faith", Skeletor is eager to finally return among the living despite Krass pointing out to him that he is still a ghost and then she is impatient with the time that the fusion between the ghost and the bones will take. Skeletor chafes at childish impatience, to which an angry Krass claims she is not a child but Skeletor implies otherwise with the girl's desire to see her parents again at all costs. He also reveals to her that He-Man has been corrupted by the power of the Sigil and that he is now one of them. The dastardly spirit then begins the fusion ritual.

In "In-Can't-Ation", the fusion ending, the castle's Havoc is unleashed through Eternia and a resurrected Skeletor in a new form far more powerful than ever declares the show has only just begun.

In "The Beginning of the End Part 1", Skeletor astrally projects his head all over Eternia, claiming that Grayskull's true power is Havoc and that having been hidden from all peoples for a thousand years, then himself as new god intends to share this power even though many people will be too weak to survive it and the others will become his servants either Dark Masters or skeletal-looking minions under the name of Skele-Drones while he transforms the planet into a cradle difficulty. Beast-Man crawls back to his former master but Skeletor still has a grudge against him for his earlier betrayal and doesn't see how he would be useful to him now though he decides to give him one last chance by turning him into his first Skele-Drone, also forcing Krass to watch the horrific transformation.

Later, Skeletor senses that Duncan, aided by his enemies, created a device that could prevent Eternia from terraforming. Krass begins to contradict the idea of seeing her parents come back to life in such a horrible world and decides to leave her mentor. Skeletor isn't at all surprised that she ended up turning against him and also admits that he only intended to bring Krass' parents back as Skele-Drones, enraging the young girl who sacrificed everything because of the evil lord's promise to her, but Skeletor counters that her everything wasn't worth much.

More than enraged, Rampage furiously attacks Skeletor but even putting all her strength and Havoc power into it, she is no match for him and he brutally beats her. While Skeletor admits to having slightly enjoyed the brief collaboration, He-Man joins the confrontation and the two sworn enemies seem at first on an equal footing but Skeletor quickly regains the upper hand. He takes the opportunity to taunt He-Man for not having the guts to stop him for good, unlike Eldress to kill King Grayskull before he got too far, calling Adam's weakness a strength for him. Rampage comes to He-Man's aid, allowing them to briefly put Skeletor's back against the wall and push him back with a combo attack into the castle's energy well.

He quickly comes back to the charge, grabbing Krass mid-air and begins killing her by pressing her against the castle's Havoc ray, sadistically adding that at least he will keep his promise to reunite her with her parents. Helpless, He-Man offers the Power Sword in exchange for Krass's life as with the power of the sword his uncle would be able to reshape the entire universe. At first suspicious until Adam claims he doesn't want the power but just his friend, Skeletor lets go of Krass and takes the sword which he combines with his Havoc Staff. After He-Man's power passes through him, Skeletor transforms into a dragon version of himself, destroying Castle Grayskull simultaneously.

In "The Beginning of the End Part 2", the beast drains Cringer's power and attacks Teela, Duncan, Evil-Lyn and Trap-Jaw while announcing that there will soon be only beings like him and after that they failed to stop him, Skeletor opens a rift to the heart of the universe. His enemies try again to stop him, only for him to in turn drain Teela and Duncan's powers and absorb Trap Jaw until he turns back into Kronis while Evil-Lyn is forcibly taken away by her spiritual bat. Skeletor then enters inside the heart.

Deep within the universe, Skeletor uses his seemingly limitless powers of Havoc to transform all planets and everything on them into his image. Suddenly, the Masters of the Universe having awakened their former true power confront their sworn enemy once again. Surprisingly surprised, Skeletor continues to taunt Adam because he knows he will never kill and nothing can stop him anymore but Krass declares nothing can stop them either and the fight begins. Despite their relentlessness, their more powerful attacks than ever and He-Man managing to retrieve the Power Sword and disconnecting some of the evil dragon's power, the five friends are defeated by Skeletor. The self-proclaimed god nearly grabs his nephew but Krass pushes He-Man waits and it is she who ends up in his former master's hand. As he grinds it in his enormous palm, Skeletor declares to Krass that this is what happens when you bite the hand that feeds it. Before it's too late for her, Krass harnesses her full power to break free and then the Masters of the Universe charges the Power Sword as much as they can. Skeletor tries one last time to kill his nephew's four friends with his left hand alone, but a He-Man with a Power Sword so charged with energy that it has become gigantic, sever his forearm, separating him from the Havoc Staff. Deprived of his catalysts, Skeletor is no longer able to contain all of his immeasurable power which disintegrates, returning him to his usual form but with his skeletal arm severed.

Weakened and crashing into an asteroid in front of his enemies while Eternia is purified of Havoc, Skeletor gets overpowered by the lightning of the Power Sword. Back in Eternos, He-Man brings his uncle back to Keldor once again with his restored left arm in front of Randor. The once Skeletor is unable to understand why with the true power of the universe in their possession, he chose instead to fully return him to his former human form. Adam replies that it was the right thing to do, but he doesn't expect his uncle to understand. Taken to the dungeon where Randor says he will spend the rest of his life, Keldor warns his brother and nephew that they have no idea what awaits them from the visions he saw while he was transforming the universe, advocating a new threat.

Outside of Eternos, Beast-Man retrieves the Havoc Staff from Skeletor's gigantic severed skeletal arm.

Powers and abilities
Skeletor is a borderline competent sorcerer with control over a vast range of dark magical powers, such as the ability to teleport himself and others over vast distances, send telepathic commands to his minions, grow plants, hypnotize, cast illusions, reflect magic, project freezing rays, and open gateways between dimensions. He also possesses considerable scientific skill, and is shown to have skill in creating various machines and devices in both the Filmation and New Adventures animated series. The 2002 series also shows him as a highly skilled swordsman, wielding dual swords and taking on multiple opponents.

He is usually armed with a magical weapon called the Havoc Staff, a long sceptre crowned with a ram's skull—sometimes depicted with an embedded crystal ball. He can discharge bolts of mystic force from the head of the Staff, or use it as a focus for more powerful forms of magic such as the theft of dreams. Skeletor has also displayed the ability to discharge energy from his own body, as is seen in the 1987 film where he casts lightning from his hands and in the original animated series where he projects energy from his fingertips. In the 2002 series, his innate powers seem much more limited; though his abilities, when in conjunction with his Havoc Staff seem nearly unmitigated in scope and highly potent in raw power.

In the early mini-comics, Skeletor sometimes possesses one half of the Power Sword. From this weapon he could also project magical energies. He also performed remote viewing via crystal ball. He has also shown himself to be a gifted swordsman. As a master of the occult arts, he is also privy to much secret knowledge about the universe.

All versions portray Skeletor as being extremely cunning and intelligent. He is also very strong, although his strength is no match for He-Man's. He has few weaknesses, aside from his inability to control his anger, and on occasion his overconfidence can also be his undoing.

Animals

Despite his generally callous attitude towards his henchmen and others, Skeletor displays a certain degree of affinity towards animals. Skeletor's most constant animal companion is Panthor.

Panthor is Skeletor's evil feline companion, a giant purple panther who serves as an evil counterpart to Battle Cat. Panthor is portrayed as Skeletor's pet, being at the right of his throne. However, unlike He-Man's Battle Cat, Panthor only appears in a handful of stories in the original series. While his role is similarly limited in the 2002 series, he is more prominent in the episodes in which he appears compared to his appearances in the earlier series.

In He-Man and She-Ra: A Christmas Special, Skeletor also shows some affinity towards Relay, a partly-robotic dog who is a part of the Manchines. When shot down by Hordak late into the special, Skeletor is at first ready to leave Relay behind on a snowy mountain top but decides to carry Relay with him when he can't bear to listen to his whimpering. Although Skeletor appears annoyed by Relay licking his face, he refuses to let Miguel or Alisha carry the creature.

In The New Adventures of He-Man, Skeletor becomes friends with a small mutant creature named Grr. After intimidating Grr to submission, he pets it and decides he likes it because the creature is apparently as vicious as he.

Advertising
 Skeletor appeared in a Streets commercial advertising branded ice cream of the franchise in Australia in 1985, with Australian voice actor Keith Scott voicing him.
 Skeletor was featured in a series of ads for Honda, voiced by Jeff Bennett.
 Skeletor also appeared dancing in television advertisements for Moneysupermarket.com in March 2017.
 Skeletor made an appearance in a GEICO commercial in September 2017, voiced by Bill Lobley.

Legacy
Skeletor was the inspiration for the 2019 self-help book What Would Skeletor Do? Diabolical Ways to Master the Universe by Robb Pearlman. He also makes a cameo appearance alongside He-Man in the 2022 film Chip 'n Dale: Rescue Rangers with Alan Oppenheimer reprising his role.

See also
 Szkieletor, a structure in Kraków, Poland, nicknamed after Skeletor (using the Polish version of the name)
 Lich
 Ōgon Bat

References

Comics characters who use magic
Extraterrestrial supervillains
Fictional characters introduced in 1981
Fictional characters who can move at superhuman speeds
Fictional characters who can teleport
Fictional characters who have made pacts with devils
Fictional characters who use magic
Fictional characters with energy-manipulation abilities
Fictional characters with immortality
Fictional characters with superhuman durability or invulnerability
Fictional characters with superhuman strength
Fictional commanders
Fictional cyborgs
Fictional demons and devils
Fictional dictators
Fictional liches
Fictional necromancers
Fictional scientists
Fictional skeletons
Fictional swordfighters
Fictional telepaths
Fictional wandfighters
Fictional warlords
Fictional wizards
Male characters in animated series
Male film villains
Masters of the Universe Evil Warriors
Villains in animated television series